Dennis Simpson (August 12, 1904 – October 24, 1977) was an American baseball first baseman in the Negro leagues. He played with the Baltimore Sox in 1933. He is also listed simply as Simpson.

References

External links
 and Seamheads

Baltimore Black Sox players
1904 births
1977 deaths
Baseball players from Illinois
Baseball first basemen
People from Jackson County, Illinois
20th-century African-American sportspeople